Perry is a unisex given name.

People

Male
 Perry Adair, American golfer
 Perry Adkisson, entomologist and Chancellor of the Texas A&M University System
 Perry Anderson, British historian and political essayist
 Perry Anderson (ice hockey), Canadian hockey player
 Perry Anzilotti, American actor
 Perry Armstrong, American politician
 Perry Baker, American rugby sevens player
 Perry Bamonte, guitarist and bassist best known for his work with The Cure
 Perry Richardson Bass (1914-2006), American heir, investor and philanthropist
 Perry Bellegarde, Canadian First Nations and Métis activist and politician
 Perry Benson, English actor
 Perry Berezan, Canadian hockey player
 Perry Bhandal, British director and screenwriter
 Perry Blake, Irish singer and songwriter
 Perry Bradford, African-American composer and vaudeville performer
 Perry Brass, American author, journalist, playwright, essayist, and gay activist
 Perry Brautigam, German soccer player and coach
 Perry Broad, Nazi SS member at Auschwitz
 Perry Bullard, American politician
 Perry Caravello, aspiring actor
 Perry Carter, American football player and coach
 Perry Chen, American artist and the creator of Kickstarter
 Perry Christie, Bahamian politician and Prime Minister of the Bahamas
 Perry Cohea, American pioneer
 Perry Collins, entrepreneur best known for the Russian-American Telegraph
 Perry Como, American singer and television presenter
 Perry Cook, American computer music researcher and head of the Princeton Sound Lab
 Perry Cotton, footballer
 Perry Criscitelli, American restaurant owner and alleged member of the Bonanno crime family
 Perry Crosswhite, Australian Olympic basketball player and administrator
 Perry Currin, American baseball player
 Perry Daneshgari, Iranian-American entrepreneur
 Perry Danos, American musician
 Perry DeAngelis, American podcaster
 Perry Digweed, English footballer
 Perry Lee Dunn, American football player
 Perry B. Duryea (state senator), American politician
 Perry B. Duryea, Jr., American politician
 Perry Rand Dyck, Canadian author and professor
 Perry T. Egbert, American engineer and president of the American Locomotive Company
 Perry Ellis, American fashion designer
 Perry Ellis (basketball), American basketball player
 Perry Farrell, American musician, known as the frontman of Jane's Addiction and for creating the festival Lollapalooza
 Perry Fellwock, National Security Agency analyst and whistleblower
 Perry Fenwick, English actor known for playing Billy Mitchell in the BBC serial drama EastEnders
 Perry Ferguson, American art director, nominated for five Academy Awards
 Perry Fewell, American football coach
 Perry Filkins, American mixed martial artist
 Perry Florio, American hockey player
 Perry Freshwater, English rugby union footballer
 Perry A. Frey, American biochemist
 Perry Friedman, American professional poker player
 Perry Ganchar, Canadian hockey player
 Perry Gomez, Bahamian politician and Minister of Health of The Bahamas
 Perry Graves, American football player
 Perry Green (poker player), American poker player
 Perry Joseph Green, philosopher and preacher of the New Thought Movement
 Perry Gregg, American computer scientist and inventor
 Perry Grimm, American racecar driver
 Perry Grimm (American football), American football coach
 Perry Groves, English footballer
 Perry Haddock, Australian Rugby League player
 Perry Hale, American football player and coach
 Perry N. Halkitis, American psychologist
 Perry Harrington, American football player
 Perry Harris, New Zealand rugby union player
 Perry Hartnett, American football player
 Perry Haydn Taylor, English designer and marketer
 Perry Henzell, Jamaican film director
 Perry Hill (baseball), American Major League Baseball coach
 Perry Hoberman, American installation artist
 Perry Greeley Holden, first professor of agronomy in the United States
 Perry O. Hooper, Sr., American jurist and the 27th Chief Justice of the Alabama Supreme Court
 Perry O. Hooper, Jr., American politician
 Perry Howard, African-American attorney and Special Assistant to the Attorney General in the 1920s
 Perry Hudson, American urologist
 Perry Hummel, American politician
 Perry Jackson, American football player
 Perry Johanson, American architect
 Perry Johnson, Canadian hockey player
 Perry Jones, American basketball player
 Perry T. Jones, American tennis official
 Perry Jordan, American musician
 Perry Kalynuk, Canadian politician
 Perry J. Kaufman, American quantitative financial theorist, trader, and author
 Perry Keith, American politician and co-founder and namesake of Keithville, Louisiana
 Perry Kemp, American football player
 Perry Kendall, Canadian physician and the first Provincial Health Officer of British Columbia
 Perry Keyes, Australian singer-songwriter
 Perry King, American actor
 Perry Kitchen, American soccer player
 Perry Kivolowitz, American computer scientist, inventor, lecturer, and Academy Award winner
 Perry Klein (born 1971), American football quarterback in the National Football League who played for the Atlanta Falcons
 Perry Kollie, Liberian footballer
 Perry Kramer, American Bicycle Motocross (BMX) racer
 Perry Lafferty, American television producer
 Perry Lang, American director, writer, and actor
 Perry Lawson, British basketball player
 Perry Lentz, American professor of English language and literature
 Perry Lim, Singaporean army general and the Chief of Defence Force of the Singapore Armed Forces
 Perry Link, American professor
 Perry Lipe, American minor-league baseball player and manager
 Perry Lopez, American actor
 Perry Marshall, American entrepreneur and author
 Perry Martter, American wrestler
 Perry Mattfeld, American actress
 Perry Maxwell, American golf course architect
 Perry McCarthy, British racing driver
 Perry McGillivray, American Olympic swimmer and water polo player
 Perry McGriff, American politician
 Perry Mehrling, American professor
 Perry Meisel, American writer and professor
 Perry Miller, American historian and an authority on American Puritanism
 Perry Miller (ice hockey), National Hockey League player
 Perry Millward, English actor
 Perry Minasian (born 1980), American baseball executive
 Perry Moore, American author, screenwriter, and film director
 Perry Moss, American football player
 Perry Moss (basketball), American basketball player
 Perry Moss (golfer), professional golfer
 Perry Mubanga, Zambian footballer
 Perry Mutapa, Zambian footballer
 Perry Ng, English footballer
 Perry Noble, American preacher and senior pastor of NewSpring Church in South Carolina
 Perry Nove, British police officer and Commissioner of the City of London police
 Perry Nussbaum, the rabbi of Congregation Beth Israel from 1954 to 1973
 Perry Owens, American lawman and gunfighter of the Old West
 Perry Pandrea, American musician
 Perry Parker, Scottish rugby union player
 Perry Diamond Pearl, American politician
 Perry Pearn, Canadian hockey player
 Perry Pelensky, professional hockey player
 Perry Perlmutar, Canadian comedian
 Perry Phenix, American football player
 Perry Pirkanen, American actor
 Perry T. Rathbone, American museum director
 Perry Redd, American social activist
 Perry A. C. Reed, American politician
 Perry Rein, American television writer and producer
 Perry Rendell, English cricketer
 Perry Richardson, American musician
 Perry Riley, American football player
 Perry Robertson, American sound editor and musician
 Perry Robinson, American jazz clarinetist and composer
 Perry Ray Robinson, American civil rights activist
 Perry Rose, Belgian-Irish singer
 Perry Rosemond, Canadian television writer, producer, and director
 Perry Rosenthal, Canadian-American eye surgeon and professor
 Perry Rotella, American businessman
 Perry Russo, a key witness in Jim Garrison's investigation of the JFK assassination
 Perry T. Ryan, American lawyer and author
 Perry Salles, Brazilian film director and actor
 Perry Saturn,  American professional wrestler
 Perry Schwartz, American football player
 Perry Shields, American judge of the United States Tax Court
 Perry Smith (American football) (born 1951), American football player
 Perry Edward Smith (1928–1965), murderer depicted in the book In Cold Blood
 Perry Smith (politician) (1783–1852), American congressman
 Perry H. Smith, American state senator and state assemblyman
 Perry M. Smith, United States Air Force general
 Perry So, Hong Kong orchestral conductor
 Perry Stephens, American actor
 Perry Stevenson, American basketball coach
 Perry Stone (radio personality), American shock jock
 Perry Suckling, English footballer
 Perry Teneyck, American basketball coach
 Perry Thomas, American football coach
 Perry E. Thurston, Jr., American politician
 Perry Trimper, Canadian politician
 Perry Turnbull, Canadian hockey player
 Perry Tuttle, American football player
 Perry Ubeda, Dutch kickboxer
 Perry Van der Beck, American soccer player, manager and executive
 Perry N. Vekroff, American film director, screenwriter, and actor of the silent era
 Perry Wallace, professor of law and former college basketball player
 Perry Warbington, American basketball player
 Perry Watkins, American gay United States Army enlisted man, best known for his successful lawsuit against the military
 Perry Watson, American college basketball coach
 Perry Werden, American baseball player
 Perry Hunt Wheeler, American landscape architect
 Perry Williams (cornerback), American football player
 Perry Williams (running back), American football player
 Perry Winslow, American whaling ship master
 Perry Woodall, American politician
 Perry Young, American basketball player
 Perry Deane Young, American author and journalist

Female
 Perry Miller Adato (1920–2018), American film producer
 Perry Bard, Canadian artist
 Perry Buck, American politician
 Perry County Jane Doe (1941–1978), American unidentified woman
 Perry Mattfeld, American actress and producer
 Perry Wilson (1916–2009), American actress

Fictional characters
 Perry Carter, in the British comedy Kevin the Teenager and related media.
 Perry Cox, on the comedy television series Scrubs
 Perry Malinowski, in the film Final Destination 3
 Perry Mason, main character in works of detective fiction written by Erle Stanley Gardner
 Perry Rhodan, the titular protagonist of the German science fiction pulp magazine
 Perry White, Clark Kent's editor-in-chief at the Daily Planet
 Perry the Platypus, an anthropomorphic pet platypus of Phineas and Ferb
 Perry, the official mascot of the 2022 Commonwealth Games

See also 
 Perry (surname)
 Perry (disambiguation)
 Perri (name), a surname and given name
 Peri (name), a surname or feminine given name

English-language masculine given names
English masculine given names
English feminine given names